Interstate 140 (I-140) and North Carolina Highway 140 (NC 140) is a  auxiliary Interstate Highway and state highway in the U.S. state of North Carolina. Officially designated the John Jay Burney Jr. Freeway, it serves as a bypass of Wilmington. The western terminus of the highway is at U.S. Route 17 (US 17) near Winnabow. It heads north in western Leland before turning to the east north of an interchange with U.S. Route 74 (US 74)/U.S. Route 76 (US 76). I-140 crosses the Cape Fear River north of Navassa and the Northeast Cape Fear River northwest of Wrightsboro. I-140 ends at Interstate 40 (I-40), and the route number changes to NC 140. NC 140 continues to the east, ending at US 17 in Kirkland. 

The need for a bypass north of Wilmington was identified by the North Carolina Department of Transportation (NCDOT) in 1972. However, the first contract for construction was not awarded until 2000. In August 2005, the first segment of I-140 between I-40 and North Carolina Highway 133 (NC 133) opened. This was followed by a westward extension to U.S. Route 421 (US 421) and an eastward extension to US 17 in June 2006. US 17 was routed along the entirety of the freeway between Kirkland and US 421, running concurrently with I-140. Construction on the western segment between Winnabow and US 74/US 76 began in March 2010 and was opened in September 2014. This segment was temporarily designated as NC 140 as it lacked connection with I-140 to the east. The final segment between US 74/US 76 and US 421 began construction in 2014 and was completed in 2017. I-140 was routed along the entirety of the freeway west of I-40. Additionally, US 17 was removed from its concurrency with I-140, being rerouted through Wilmington in 2017. The remaining section between I-40 and Kirkland was subsequently renumbered as NC 140.

Route description
The western terminus of I-140 is located at a trumpet interchange with US 17 north of the community of Winnabow and southwest of Leland. The I-140 bridge crossing over US 17 at the interchange is named after Wilber E. Rabon, a former Brunswick County Commissioner. I-140 begins running to the northwest, paralleling NC 87 to the east. The highway adjusts and turns to the north, running to the west of a railroad track owned by Military Ocean Terminal Sunny Point. The highway meets US 74/US 76 (exit 5) at a partial cloverleaf interchange. Immediately to the north of the interchange, I-140 enters a residential area, with neighborhoods located on both sides of the highway. The highway also makes a turn to the southeast and east, bypassing both Leland and Navassa to the north. Two additional interchanges at Mount Misery Road (exit 8) and Cedar Hill Road (exit 10) are located along I-140 in Brunswick County. The Interstate crosses the Cape Fear River along the L. Bobby Brown Bridge and enters New Hanover County to the northwest of Wilmington. 

Entering into New Hanover County, I-140 crosses through an industrial area and begins a turn to the northeast. I-140 meets with US 421 (exit 14) at another partial cloverleaf interchange. Continuing past US 421, I-140 continues in a northeasterly direction, crossing the Northeast Cape Fear River on the Dan Cameron Bridge. Northeast of the bridge, I-140 begins a turn to the east, running alongside a General Electric/Hitachi facility. I-140 meets with NC 133 (exit 17) north of Wrightsboro while turning to the southeast. Crossing Blue Clay Road, I-140 makes another turn to the northeast but turns back to the east before crossing under US 117 and NC 132. I-140 reaches its eastern terminus at a modified cloverleaf interchange with I-40 (exit 20). The ramp between I-140 East and I-40 West uses a flyover design instead of the traditional cloverleaf design. 

At the I-40 interchange, the route number changes to NC 140 as the freeway continues to the east. Between I-40 and US 17, the highway runs slightly to the southeast primarily through a wooded area. An interchange is currently under construction with the proposed NC 417 (Military Cutoff Road) northeast of Murraysville. The eastern terminus of NC 140 is located at a trumpet interchange with US 17 in the census-designated place of Kirkland. US 17 merges onto the road and continues as a multilane arterial highway to the northeast.

History

First proposal: Raleigh to Sanford 

During the 1990s, North Carolina originally proposed the I-140 designation for  along the recently upgraded US 1 freeway between the Raleigh–Cary line and Sanford. The American Association of State Highway and Transportation Officials (AASHTO) ultimately disapproved of the routing in their 1999 meeting.

Wilmington northern bypass 

The idea of constructing a northern bypass for Wilmington was initially identified by NCDOT as a need in 1972. The outer loop was viewed as a means to help relieve traffic congestion along Market Street and the Cape Fear Memorial Bridge, serving as an additional crossing of the Cape Fear River and providing for better regional connectivity. However, the project was not included as part of the department's construction schedule until 1989. In 1991, NCDOT initiated the evaluation of a pair of proposed routes for the Northern Outer Loop.

In November 1994, the North Carolina Board of Transportation elected to move forward with the southern routing. The initial  link between I-40 and US 421 was originally to begin construction in 1998 and open by 2001. This revised "central route" was selected as the final routing by NCDOT in April 1997. Planning would continue through the late 1990s, culminating with the first contract awarded for its construction in November 2000 for the I-40 interchange.

In 1997, local officials initially stated that an Interstate designation was sought for the bypass. In September 2002, the Federal Highway Administration announced that it would grant NCDOT's request and designate the Northern Outer Loop as Interstate 140. The designation was to apply to the initial western segment constructed between I-40 and US 421 and the initial eastern segment constructed between I-40 and US 17. At the time of its announcement, the designation was touted as a significant means to enhance economic development opportunities along its route in addition to potentially serving as a tie-in for moving the proposed eastern terminus of I-74 from Myrtle Beach to Wilmington. Later that month, it was announced the segment east of I-40, would be named the John J. Burney Freeway after the state senator and trustee of the University of North Carolina at Wilmington.

In an effort to protect scenic viewsheds for motorists utilizing the freeway, the Special Highway Overlay District of the New Hanover County Zoning Ordinance was adopted by the County Commission in June 2001. Some of the restrictions of the overlay include banning the construction of billboards, limiting outdoor storage, and increasing setback requirements for structures adjacent to the roadway. Only nine applications for billboards along I-140 were processed and approved prior to its passage.

Construction and opening
The initial $36.7-million (equivalent to $ in ) contract for construction of a  segment of the eastern leg was awarded by NCDOT to Barnhill Contracting Company in November 2003. Its construction had been delayed due to several conflicts. This included the handling of stormwater runoff into Futch Creek and a slight redesign of an offramp at the Market Street interchange in Kirkland to avoid a 450-year-old oak tree. Construction of the eastern segment commenced on December 29, 2003. As late as May 2005, NCDOT remained undecided as to whether or not to open only a portion of the road prior to completion of the elevated section due to the bridge section running behind schedule. The first segment of I-140 opened to traffic on August 22, 2005. Formally dedicated with Governor Mike Easley and US Representative Mike McIntyre in attendance, the  segment was located between I-40 and NC 133 (Castle Hayne Road). In November 2005, the North Carolina Board of Transportation voted unanimously to name the I-140 bridge across the Northeast Cape Fear River in honor of former Wilmington mayor and businessman Dan Cameron.

In June 2006, NCDOT announced two additional segments of the I-140 project would open by the end of the month. Costing $187 million (equivalent to $ in ) to complete, the US 17 expressway segment between Market Street and I-40 and the segment between NC 133 and US 421 both opened to traffic on June 30, 2006. Concurrent with its opening, the routing of US 17 through Wilmington was also moved to the newly opened expressway; the previous routing of US 17 through Wilmington was changed to U.S. Highway 17 Business (US 17 Bus.), and the U.S. Highway 17 Truck (US 17 Truck) designation was removed from Military Cutoff Road and Oleander Drive upon the opening of the bypass, with through trucks being directed to utilize the newly constructed freeway.

Brunswick County extension
Originally, the freeway was scheduled to be extended west from its current terminus at US 421 to US 74/US 76 first. However, in 2009, NCDOT announced plans to complete the segment between US 17 in Winnabow and US 74/US 76 before the central segment, which would require a bridge across the Cape Fear River. In response to this decision, town leaders from Navassa filed a discrimination complaint against NCDOT, claiming the town was frequently denied funding for infrastructure improvements and other projects. Planning for future construction continued, and, in March 2010, NCDOT awarded an $81.7-million (equivalent to $ in ) contract to Barnhill Contracting Company. The project involved the construction of the  segment between the US 74/US 76 intersection and US 17 south of Leland. Construction of the segment began in March 2010 as a result of receiving partial funding through the American Recovery and Reinvestment Act.

As part of the expansion into Brunswick County, NCDOT designed several wildlife crossings to allow the black bear and other animals to safely cross the corridor in the vicinity of the Battle Royal Natural Heritage Site. The crossings included the extension of four bridges to provide some upland areas from animal crossings along water bodies and the construction of a  wildlife tunnel just north of the US 74/US 76 interchange. The section between US 17 and US 74/US 76 was opened to traffic in September 2014.

With the opening of the Brunswick segment, NC 140 was routed along the entirety of the new freeway. On January 14, 2015, the Certification of Rulemaking was released, confirming the establishment of the new designation along not only the Brunswick segment but all existing and future sections of the Wilmington bypass. The justification in the paperwork for using NC 140 was it would serve as a temporary designation until the entire bypass was complete and the remaining segments could be submitted to AASHTO approval as I-140. The other rationalization was to provide an alternate designation for the entire bypass if a proposal to return US 17 to the streets of Wilmington was enacted. This was prevalent as only the New Hanover segment of I-140 was concurrent with US 17. NCDOT officials in the summer of 2014 called for returning US 17 to its original routing through Wilmington on Market Street, with the exception of placing a part of it on Military Cutoff Road and Oleander Drive. This was due to traffic volume on these roads being large enough to merit a route designation. The proposal was endorsed by the Wilmington Area Transportation Advisory Committee in August 2014. AASHTO's Special Committee on U.S. Route Numbering approved the request on May 14, 2015. On May 17, 2017, US 17 was officially rerouted through Wilmington.

On December 15, 2017, a ribbon-cutting ceremony was held for the final section of the freeway between US 74/US 76 and US 421, officially completing I-140 around Wilmington. However, this segment of road did not officially open to traffic until December 19, 2017, due to the road requiring final construction and cleanup. I-140 was officially extended west to replace NC 140 between US 17 and US 74/US 76 on August 7, 2018.

Future
In 2002, the North Carolina Board of Transportation appropriated $10 million for the construction of an interchange at Blue Clay Road. The interchange would serve in providing better access to both Wilmington International Airport and the Cape Fear Community College North Campus. There is currently no timeline for the completion of the interchange.

An interchange is currently being constructed with the proposed NC 417 as part of the extension of Military Cutoff Road and Hampstead Bypass. Once completed, NC 417 and I-140/NC 140 will form a bypass of US 17 from Winnabow to Hampstead. Construction on the Military Cutoff Road extension began in 2017, and the interchange is expected to open to traffic in the spring of 2023. Work is expected to begin on the Hamstead Bypass north of NC 210 in late 2020, with construction of the segment between NC 140 and NC 210 beginning in 2023. Roadwork is expected to be completed in 2025.

The proposed Cape Fear Crossing project is proposed to have its western terminus at I-140 in Brunswick County. The proposed freeway would extend east, crossing the Cape Fear River along a newly constructed bridge. The project is currently funded for right-of-way acquisition in the 2019–2029 State Transportation Improvement Plan. However, no construction funding is currently allocated to the project. Once funding is received, it would take approximately five years to complete.

Exit list

References

External links

 
 Interstate 140 North Carolina @ Interstate-Guide.com
 North Carolina @ SouthEastRoads.com - Interstate 140
 I-140 Wilmington Bypass @ NC Future Interstates
 I-140 Exit List
 NCRoads.com: I-140

40-1 North Carolina
40-1
Transportation in Brunswick County, North Carolina
Transportation in New Hanover County, North Carolina
1 (North Carolina)